Bagavathi Perumal, popularly known as Bucks, is an Indian actor, who has worked in Tamil films. Perumal debuted in Balaji Tharaneetharan's critically acclaimed Naduvula Konjam Pakkatha Kaanom (2012). Bagavathi has since appeared in pivotal roles in films including Oru Kanniyum Moonu Kalavaanikalum (2014), Naalu Policeum Nalla Irundha Oorum (2015), Pichaikkaran (2016) and Super Deluxe (2019).

Career
After starting his career as an assistant director, Bucks initially assisted Director Karthik Raghunath for couple of movies, Later he joined director Gautham Vasudev Menon's crew for the blockbuster Kaaka Kaaka  and finally was with the team of Director N.Krishna for the movie Sillunu Oru Kaadhal .

He debuted as an actor in Balaji Tharaneetharan's critically acclaimed Naduvula Konjam Pakkatha Kaanom (2012), portraying himself in a film inspired by a real-life event. The film became a sleeper hit, with the actor gaining reviews for his portrayal.
In 2014, Bucks appeared in Chimbu Deven's fantasy comedy Oru Kanniyum Moonu Kalavaanikalum, portraying a mischievous pal alongside Arulnithi and Bindu Madhavi. The film opened to positive reviews and had an average run at the box office. He was later seen playing a small role in Karthik Subbaraj's Jigarthanda, playing the cinematographer of the film directed by Siddharth in the movie. He was also later seen playing in movie Naalu Policeum Nalla Irundha Oorum, where he featured alongside Arulnithi for the second time.

He was seen in the film Super Deluxe (2019) as a corrupt, womanizing cop. The film opened to rave reviews.

Filmography

Web series

References

External links

Living people
Male actors in Tamil cinema
Indian male film actors
21st-century Indian male actors
Tamil comedians
1978 births